Maurice Wood (6 July 1933 – 18 March 1978) was an English first-class cricketer active 1954–55 who played for Nottinghamshire. He was born and died in Nottingham.

References

External links

1933 births
1978 deaths
English cricketers
Nottinghamshire cricketers